Torbes River is an important river of short length which sources are located at the Táchira state, in Venezuela. The city of San Cristóbal is established at the left side of the river.

See also
List of rivers of Venezuela

Rivers of Táchira